John Bagwell may refer to:
 John Bagwell (1715–1784), Irish MP for Tulsk 1761–68
John Bagwell (died 1816) (1751–1816), MP for Tipperary
John Bagwell (Liberal politician) (1811–1883), Liberal politician, MP for Clonmel, Lord of the Treasury
John Philip Bagwell (1874–1946), Irish railway executive and politician, grandson of the above

See also
Bagwell (surname)